Kolbäcksån is a river located in Bergslagen in the middle of Sweden. It is about 180 kilometres long, arises in the province Dalarna and flows through the province of Västmanland into the Mälaren. The river drains an area of approximately 3,100 km2 and has an average discharge of 27 m3/s. The city of Fagersta lies on the river and the Strömsholm Canal follows the river about 100 kilometres.

References

Rivers of Västmanland County
Norrström basin
Rivers of Dalarna County